Attorney General Allen may refer to:

Charles Allen (jurist) (1827–1913), Attorney General of Massachusetts
Ebenezer Allen (Texas politician) (1804–1863), Attorney General of Texas
John Campbell Allen (1817–1898), Attorney General of New Brunswick
J. Weston Allen (1872–1942), Attorney General of Massachusetts

See also
John Allan (Australian politician) (1866–1936), Attorney-General of Victoria
William Allain (1928–2013), Attorney General of Mississippi
General Allen (disambiguation)